The infraorbital artery is an artery in the head that branches off the maxillary artery, emerging through the infraorbital foramen, just under the orbit of the eye.

Course
The infraorbital artery appears, from its direction, to be the continuation of the trunk of the maxillary artery, but often arises in conjunction with the posterior superior alveolar artery.

It runs along the infraorbital groove and canal with the infraorbital nerve, and emerges on the face through the infraorbital foramen, beneath the infraorbital head of the levator labii superioris muscle.

Branches
While in the canal, it gives off 
 (a) orbital branches which assist in supplying the inferior rectus and inferior oblique and the lacrimal sac, and
 (b) anterior superior alveolar arteries - branches which descend through the anterior alveolar canals to supply the upper incisor and canine teeth and the mucous membrane of the maxillary sinus.

On the face, some branches pass upward to the medial angle of the orbit and the lacrimal sac, anastomosing with the angular artery, a branch of the facial artery; others run toward the nose, anastomosing with the dorsal nasal branch of the ophthalmic artery; and others descend between the levator labii superioris and the levator anguli oris, and anastomose with the facial artery, transverse facial artery, and buccal artery.

The four remaining branches arise from that portion of the maxillary artery which is contained in the pterygopalatine fossa.

Additional images

References

External links
 

Arteries of the head and neck